Hypericum scruglii is a species of flowering plant of the St. John's wort family (Hypericaceae) that is found in Sardinia.

Taxonomy 
The placement of H. scruglii within Hypericum can be summarized as follows:

Hypericum

 Hypericum subg. Hypericum
 Hypericum sect. Adenosepalum
 subsect. Adenosepalum
 subsect. Aethiopica
 Huber-Morathii group
 subsect. Caprifolia
 H. caprifolium
 H. coadunatum
 H. collenetteae
 H. naudinianum
 H. psilophytum
 H. pubescens
 H. scruglii
 H. sinaicum
 H. somaliense
 H. tomentosum

References 

scruglii
Flora of Sardinia
Plants described in 2010